Polyana is a rural locality (a settlement) in Klintsovsky District, Bryansk Oblast, Russia. The population was 43 as of 2010. There is 1 street.

Geography 
Polyana is located 28 km south of Klintsy (the district's administrative centre) by road. Malaya Topal is the nearest rural locality.

References 

Rural localities in Klintsovsky District